George Carson (1848 – 1921) was a Scottish trade unionist.

Carson became prominent as a leader of the Scottish Tin Plate and Sheet Metal Workers' Society.  In 1901, he was elected as secretary of the Parliamentary Committee of the Scottish Trades Union Congress (STUC), and in 1902 he became the leader of the associated Scottish Workers' Representation Committee.  Also that year, he was elected as secretary of Glasgow Trades Council.

Carson was a founder member of the Scottish Labour Party in 1888.  When the Independent Labour Party was founded in 1893, Carson unsuccessfully moved that it be named the "Socialist Labour Party", and was elected to its first National Administrative Council.  In 1910, he was elected to Glasgow City Council for the Labour Party in Maryhill.

References

1848 births
1921 deaths
Councillors in Glasgow
Independent Labour Party National Administrative Committee members
Scottish Labour councillors
Trade unionists from Glasgow
General Secretaries of the Scottish Trades Union Congress
Scottish Labour Party (1888) politicians
British political party founders